Huichapan (Otomi: Nxamädo)  is a town and one of the 84 municipalities of Hidalgo, in central-eastern Mexico. The municipality covers an area of 668.1 km². Its name derives from the Classical Nahuatl Huēyichiyapan.

As of 2005, the municipality had a total population of 39,734. In 2017 there were 425 inhabitants who spoke an indigenous language, primarily Otomí del Valle del Mezquital

References

Municipalities of Hidalgo (state)
Populated places in Hidalgo (state)
Pueblos Mágicos
Otomi settlements